Jane Bonham Carter, Baroness Bonham-Carter of Yarnbury (born 20 October 1957) is a British Liberal Democrat politician, and member of the House of Lords.

Background

Family
Bonham Carter hails from the Bonham Carter family. Her great-grandfather was H. H. Asquith, the former Prime Minister, and her grandparents were Maurice Bonham Carter and Violet Bonham Carter. Her father Mark Bonham Carter was a Liberal MP before becoming a Liberal Democrat Life Peer. Her aunt Laura Bonham Carter married Jo Grimond, who was to become Leader of the Liberal Party. Her family is the only example so far where three generations have received Life Peerages under the Life Peerages Act 1958.
Her maternal grandfather is the American publisher Condé Nast.

In 2008 she was reported to be the partner of Baron Tim Razzall. Bonham Carter has declared the relationship in the House of Lords Register of Interests.

Her cousins include the actress Helena Bonham Carter and fellow Liberal Democrat parliamentarian Raymond Asquith, 3rd Earl of Oxford and Asquith.

Education
Bonham-Carter was educated at St. Paul's Girls' School, an independent school in Brook Green, Hammersmith, west London, and at University College London.

Career
Bonham-Carter worked in television before being raised to the peerage, spending time at both the BBC and Channel 4, producing programmes such as Panorama, Newsnight and A Week In Politics.

In 1996 she became the Liberal Democrats' Director of Communications, a role she held through the 1997 election before returning to a career in television as an independent producer at Brook Lapping Productions, where she produced a number of documentaries for Channel 4, the BBC and ITV, including the award-winning series Maggie: the First Lady.

On 23 June 2004 she was created a Life Peeress as Baroness Bonham-Carter of Yarnbury, of Yarnbury in the County of Wiltshire, and was appointed Liberal Democrat Spokesperson for Broadcasting and the Arts.

She has been a member of various House of Lords Select Committees, including the BBC Charter review set up in 2005, and the Parliamentary Communications Committee.

After the formation of the coalition government in 2010, she was elected deputy convenor of Liberal Democrat Peers and was appointed co-chair of the Liberal Democrat Parliamentary Party Committee for Culture, Olympics, Media and Sport, which includes the role of Liberal Democrat spokesperson on DCMS matters in the House of Lords.

Bonham-Carter has served on the advisory committee of the thinktank Centre Forum since 2005, and RAPT (Rehabilitation for Addicted Prisoners Trust) since 1999. She was a board member of the National Campaign for the Arts from 2010 to 2012.

She is a Vice-President of the Debating Group.

On 19 April 2015 it was announced that Bonham-Carter would be a patron of the Studio Theatre, Ashley Road, Salisbury.

Controversy
Jane Bonham Carter attracted criticism in 2008 when it was revealed that she and her partner, Tim Razzall, had both claimed House of Lords expenses for a flat that they shared, although it was not claimed that a breach of the rules had occurred. The House of Lords expenses system was later changed to give peers a flat rate irrespective of their residence.

Arms

See also
Bonham Carter family
Asquith family

Notes

References

External links
Debrett's People of Today
Burke's Peerage & Baronetage

Bonham-Carter of Yarnbury
Bonham-Carter of Yarnbury
Bonham-Carter of Yarnbury
Life peeresses created by Elizabeth II
Bonham-Carter of Yarnbury
Asquith family
Jane
Alumni of University College London
Razzall family
Daughters of life peers
Bonham Carter 3